Christopher James Cash (born July 13, 1980) is the Assistant Secondary Coach in charge of the cornerbacks for the Seattle Seahawks of the National Football League.  Cash played professionally for the Detroit Lions and Atlanta Falcons.

High school career
He attended Franklin High School in Stockton.

College career
Cash played college football at the University of Southern California and graduated in 2002.  He was All-Pac-10 second-team as a senior for the USC Trojans.  He transferred to USC from Palomar College in San Marcos, California.  Cash accepted a scholarship to University of Colorado out of high school, but a mix-up with his transcript prevented him from enrolling.

Professional career
Cash was selected by the Detroit Lions in the sixth round (175th overall) of the 2002 NFL Draft. He started in 12 games and had 100 tackles and one interception his rookie season with the Lions, but he missed the 2003 campaign with a knee injury. In 2004, Cash played in 11 games for the Lions, starting five. Cash joined the Atlanta Falcons in September 2005 after being released by the Lions in preseason, but only played in three games. Cash spent the 2006 season (after September 2) on injured reserve. Unable to stay healthy, he was released thereafter by the Falcons and did not play another NFL game.

Coaching
He served as defensive coordinator for Franklin High School's football team for five years. In March 2013, Cash was hired as safeties coach at  Florida A&M University.

On March 25, 2015, Cash was named as an Assistant Secondary Coach for Seattle Seahawks.

References

External links
TSN Player Profile
Seahawks Coaching Bio

1980 births
Living people
American football cornerbacks
Atlanta Falcons players
Detroit Lions players
Seattle Seahawks coaches
USC Trojans football players
Players of American football from Stockton, California
Palomar Comets football players